"Fare Thee Well" is an 1816 poem by Lord Byron.

Background

Lord Byron married Annabella Milbanke on 2 January 1815. At the end of that year, their only child was born, a girl later known as Ada Lovelace, the computer programmer. Over the next few months, their marriage crumbled, and in March 1816 they made a legal settlement of separation. That month, Byron composed "Fare Thee Well" and enclosed a note that said, "Dearest Bell – I send you the first verses that ever I attempted to write upon you, and perhaps the last that I may ever write at all."

In April he signed a Deed of Separation and added the following notation:

Byron left England and never saw his wife or daughter again.

References

External links

Poetry by Lord Byron
1816 poems